An Internet Experiment Note (IEN) is a sequentially numbered document in a series of technical publications issued by the participants of the early development work groups that created the precursors of the modern Internet.

After DARPA began the Internet program in earnest in 1977, the project members were in need of communication and documentation of their work in order to realize the concepts laid out by Bob Kahn and Vint Cerf some years before. The Request for Comments (RFC) series was considered the province of the ARPANET project and the Network Working Group (NWG) which defined the network protocols used on it.  Thus, the members of the Internet project decided on publishing their own series of documents, Internet Experiment Notes, which were modeled after the RFCs.

Jon Postel became the editor of the new series, in addition to his existing role of administering the long-standing RFC series. Between March, 1977, and September, 1982, 206 IENs were published. After that, with the plan to terminate support of the Network Control Protocol (NCP) on the ARPANET and switch to TCP/IP, the production of IENs was discontinued, and all further publication was conducted within the existing RFC system.

External links
 Internet Experiment Notes index at postel.org
 IEN archive at postel.org (plain text)
 IEN archive at postel.org (PDF)
 IEN index at rfc-editor.org

History of the Internet
Internet Standards